Lake Lucerne is located near Crandon in Forest County, Wisconsin, United States. There is a boat landing on the southeast shore of the lake and a restaurant (Waters Edge) on the west shore. This restaurant performs a water ski show during the summer months. Summer homes and cottages surround the lake. There is a large, uninterrupted stretch of water on the north half of the lake. On the southern half, there is a large cluster of islands, the largest having a sand bar that is popular with swimmers. The southern tip of the lake is dotted with bays and water meadows.

Notes

Lakes of Wisconsin
Lakes of Forest County, Wisconsin